The 1968 Kansas gubernatorial election was held on November 5, 1968. Incumbent Democrat Robert Docking narrowly defeated Republican nominee Rick Harman with 51.9% of the vote.

Primary elections
Primary elections were held on August 6, 1968.

Republican primary

Candidates
Rick Harman, businessman
John Crutcher, incumbent Lieutenant Governor
Raymond J. Vanskiver

Results

General election

Candidates
Major party candidates
Robert Docking, Democratic
Rick Harman, Republican 

Other candidates
Marshall Uncapher, Prohibition

Results

References

1968
Kansas
Gubernatorial